La mujer del presidente (in English The wife of the president) was a 1997 Colombian telenovela produced and broadcast by Caracol Televisión

Plot 
"Concorde" is a successful aviation company led by Francisco de Paula Acero (Jorge Cao). One day in the party of the company, Susana Vivas de Acero (Elluz Peraza), wife of the president visits the company and showing interest by a single employee of the systems divition; Carlos Alberto Buendia (Robinson Díaz). Buendia would soon be promoted to division manager of systems, which besides being a joy for any worker would help fund the loan for an apartment, which would be for him and his wife lived (recently married secretly) Adriana Guerrero (Sandra Reyes). Later at the party, the president and his wife started dancing both. Victor Leal (Marlon Moreno), the best friend of Carlos Alberto from the start show interest in the president's wife and asks her to dance but she flatly rejects this to him. Susana invited to dance to Carlos Alberto which generates heat and anger of Adriana who dances with Paulino (Rafael Martinez), son Ricardo Diaz (Helios Fernandez) who is a business associate of the company and colleague of Carlos And Victor but jealous of Carlos' new job and his girlfriend. That night ironically Carlos and Adriana berates the woman flirting at him, so his first fight being married.

The next day, the rise of Carlos Alberto serious postponed by the President and who had been caught kissing during working hours with Adriana, all this due the Paulino gossips. She being the receptionist of the company receives a call from a woman asking for Carlos Alberto, this answers the call and thinking it was her mother quickly goes back to the house and to his surprise was Susan who had called to spend time with him and secretly making the Carlos Alberto's parents were invited to the club of the company. Between the two try to have sex but Susana asks Carlos Alberto stop telling that someday he was going to thank not having sex, while Susana asks Carlos Alberto coffee and this it is prepared as she was only underwear. Susana shows admiration for Carlos Alberto as his essence showed only love and this in turn tells her secretly married to Adriana. When testing the first sip of coffee, Susana inexplicably falls dead, in vain attempt to revive her, Carlos Alberto is visited by his aunt. Before opening and claiming to be in the shower, Carlos Alberto hides the corpse under his bed and dressed quickly getting to his aunt and also her parents who had arrived at the club. Carlos Alberto is nervous, something that both her parents strange as his aunt, this rang desperately to the house after Carlos Alberto for attending Susana let alone on the phone talking to his aunt who believed that the parents of Carlos Alberto were in the doctor. Adriana shows concern Suana suspecting that he had gone to Carlos Alberto and then goes home to claim their nerves especially since the president was looking for his wife and that this had left his car in the parking lot of the company.

Even with his nerves and arguing a call from the company, Carlos Alberto quickly dress the corpse of Susana and going to the outskirts of the city and using a shovel borrowed from a construction near his home buries the corpse of Susana.

The matter is further complicated when Carlos Alberto forget the shovel, which in the vacant lot where he had buried the corpse and had been stolen by a homeless man. So Carlos Alberto buys an equal and in the company speculates that Susan had been kidnapped or had fled with her lover. Despite this, Carlos Alberto received his promotion as head of systems where then is not only dedicated to his work but also to say nothing of what happened to the president's wife, if only he tells Victor. Francisco de Paula Acero still looking for his wife and their only clue is a taxi she had taken at the entrance to the company once had left his car in the parking lot. To avoid any suspicion of the president, Carlos Alberto and Victor look for the taxi, which is managed by Pedro Nel Rivadeneria (Saín Castro), known as "The Senate" (by name which seemed that of a politician) and this does not say much about the lady but was admired for her beauty.

The kidnapping of Susana makes Andrés (Roberto Cano), the son of her and Francisco de Paula ask for help from Carlos Alberto and this agrees at all times while being wary of any attempt of suspicion of the young. The board of trustees "Concorde" decides to pay two million dollars for the rescue of Susana, which are led by Andrés and Carlos Alberto to a proposed strategic site for the alleged captors but a few days no news of the hijackers or Susana and then to check the place where they had thrown the bag with the rescue, Andres and Carlos Alberto are surprised to see the woman being carried on a plane.

The situation is complicated for Carlos Alberto being horrified to see the woman and knowing that Susana de Acero had died at home. Victor with his best friend is the only one who knows the true situation and even more when Carlos Alberto's birthday, he receives a gift 4 million COP in an anonymous box. His parents asked not to spend money until it know its origin. To make matters worse the president knowing that a taxi would be the only witness to the whereabouts of his wife, decides to send several taxi companies leaflets giving a reward for the whereabouts of his wife.

Carlos Alberto and Victor have several encounters with "The Senate", the taxi driver who had brought home Susana de Acero of it first and the driver required 2 million COP by their silence, Carlos Alberto da no choice but 2 of the 4 million, but "The Senate" and his assistant require even more money for his silence. Carlos Alberto's parents ignore the situation even though Adriana surprised even the nerves and mood swings from Carlos Alberto, he and Victor would ask for a loan then Inés Cuervo (Maria Margarita Giraldo), a lady friend of Victor's father to believe that the 4 million had disappeared. Despite the bribe given to "The Senate" and his assistant, they are killed by 'The Janquiz' (Carlos Arango), a private detective working for Acero and Milton (head of security "Concorde") and then the detective threatens to kill Adriana and kills Mrs. Inés lender saw Carlos Alberto was hiding the whereabouts of Susan de Acero. Not withstanding the situation, Carlos Alberto makes Victor hides Adriana and in turn would tell the truth to Acero claims it would not have called him, the police or an ambulance. Carlos Alberto, Acero and Milton takes the place of burial of Susanna place where two homeless (with whom he had already crossed Carlos Alberto to substantiate that the body was not discovered) have put a dirty hut but find that the body had been dug up and taken to the morgue by the homeless to the police. Acero, Carlos Alberto into believing that the alleged kidnappers had set a trap swears help to flee the country along with Victor and Adriana. The plan is Milton and Acero and cast them into the sea in mid-flight but the plan changed when Carlos Alberto once goodbye to her parents an takes his passport and leave the house is arrested by the police, while Adriana and Victor are also arrested on charges of kidnapping and murder. Adriana goes free when it was determined that he had no involvement and knowledge of the facts while omitting that Acero had said that his wife was alive and safe at home, a fact that the Acero's lawyer Bernardo de Vengoechea (Luis Fernando Munera) asked omitted in his statement. Victor and Carlos Alberto by failing to obtain sufficient evidence to prove their innocence are taken to the National Prison in Bogota.

In the Jail 
Arriving at the prison they are received by Lucas (Jorge Cardenas), the Messenger of the prison who being an intermediary between the new inmates and Hugo Escobar (Waldo Urrego), cruel captain of the guard in the jail. Escobar a thick amount of money required to put them in a good courtyard; the fifth. Carlos Alberto and Victor gives the money to Escobar from their bank accounts but this only complies to Carlos Alberto; makes it the first in the fifth courtyard of the jail (first-time criminals) and Victor (repeat criminals). Although Carlos Alberto is not bothered by anyone, Victor meanwhile is harassed by criminals, even one who is gay but is protected by Rigoberto Bernal (Fabio Rubiano), former high school teammate. Escobar asked the family of Carlos Alberto and the father of Victor one million pesos to change Victor of courtyard, however Alfonso Valdés (Rafael Bohorquez), Carlos Alberto's Attorney and family friend later asked by scruples not to pay him the captain, given Colombia history of the trafficking of influences and extortion. Carlos Alberto cleverly hides the money and uses for Bernal to protect Victor.

Escobar also burned a letter from Antonio, father Victor, his son keeps under surveillance to Carlos Alberto and Victor. Carlos Alberto then gives his testimony of the facts to Luz Suarez de Caballero (Celmira Luzardo), prison social worker and she replied he must have the full facts for his defense. Subsequently, falls into a trap of a famous prisoner named Enrique Blanco Sotomayor "The illusionist" (Julio Cesar Luna) so that it would be involved a leak taking advantage of a Commission on human rights to the jail visit. The flight is carried out in complicity with Corporal Ordóñez (Henry Castillo) but Carlos Alberto is discovered by Captain Escobar after trying to say goodbye to Victor. "The illusionist" has been moved from jail while Carlos Alberto and Victor are tortured by Captain Escobar, this was asked to report to one of the traitors guards but Carlos Alberto to see Ordonez refuses to accuse, to denounce it and Corporal saves the life of both by sending them to the Dungeon. Carlos Alberto is still more implicated in the death of Susana already that the nails of the corpse had been found remains of the failed sexual relation between her and the man skin and blood what did result in a rape.

Carlos Alberto is transferred to the courtyard where they were Victor and Bernal. Then jail dismiss several bureaucratic roles then archive them in computer systems, Victor gets the map of prison and with Bernal is planning a prison escape. For its part Acero and Vengoechea allied with Melchizedek Garzón (Germán Escallon), a corrupt police officer of the Prosecutor's Office known as "El Gozque" and among the three plan to accuse Victor and Carlos Alberto of belonging to the guerrilla movement, then that Ricardo Diaz claimed the alleged Susana bailout money. Escobar following the orders of "El Gozque" torture of Carlos Alberto that he declared that guerrilla but Victor is most severely tortured. The parents of Carlos Alberto and the father of Victor do not believe the news that their children are guerrillas and Antonio, the father of Victor dies suddenly at hearing this news. Victor is forced to confess that he is threatened guerrilla that her father would be assassinated (when it had already died). Escobar received a letter from the Prosecutor's Office asking that Victor was at the funeral and burial of his father but to humiliate Victor decides not to give such a letter, but Lucas decides to give it because it had gone through a similar situation and makes it not without before tell Esteban Franco (Juan Carlos Vargas), his best friend in prison. However, Escobar knowing that Lucas would give the Victor's postcard, murders and disappears Lucas and Escobar making believe even the Director of the prison Doctor Sierra (Luis Fernando Ardila) that Lucas has escaped. Esteban intuiting that Escobar had murdered Lucas tells him to light and in turn requests changed yard seventh to the first courtyard where they were Carlos Alberto and Victor. Once changed, Escobar harasses Esteban to not approaching Carlos Alberto nor to Victor but he disobeys and Esteban tells Victor that Lucas died in the attempt to give the letter of attorney on the death of his father, something what Victor feel indirect guilt and full of rage is hit Escobar but is stopped by Carlos Alberto since beating the captain of the guards bring him more problems.

Subsequently, two imprisoned guerrillas put pressure on Carlos Alberto to deliver a proposal of peace to dignitaries of the Government giving him 24 hours of freedom, Carlos Alberto accepts and takes the assignment where leverages to visit the tomb of Antonio, father of Victor, visiting their parents and visit Adriana who would have achieved an intimate friendship with Andres who felt a great attraction to her at the same time and that in turn was looking for Justice on the death of his mother. Carlos Alberto full of anger he complains to Adriana but she replied also on the short-lived relationship that he had with Susana de Acero and both have sex in the house of the girl for the next day be discovered by Beatriz (Lucy Martinez), mother of Adriana and which at the same time hates Carlos Alberto. This gives flight to return to jail given the 24-hour deadline established by the guerrillas but arrives late and with difficulty trafficking to prison wing. Escobar believed that Carlos Alberto had escaped from prison is to search for it and Esteban argues see Carlos Alberto in the bathroom (a strategy to win time) and Carlos Alberto surprisingly manages to enter before Escobar kill Esteban claiming to be in the bathroom of women. Carlos Alberto although he was threatened to kill Victor if not returning tells him that performed Ordóñez, who was a guerrilla and hated Escobar, is had managed that Carlos Alberto achieved return to jail and Ordóñez commended it of having fulfilled its task, since the Government had accepted the proposals submitted and that it would soon need it for similar tasks. Humiliated Escobar ordered Corporal Edison Abril (Diego Vásquez) to kill Carlos Alberto and disappear as to Lucas. The assassination plan comes to ears of Bernal who insists they escape from prison, Victor argues see an exhaust pipe in the levels and whose tube going to the laundry, which was in charge of an old prison man called Moses (Pedro Mogollon) who had granted Carlos Alberto a cellular call to Adriana.

Victor decides to infiltrate the laundry arguing working for Moses and the exhaust pipe with two roads, one of which gave the street taking advantage of conjugal visits notes. Adriana visit to Carlos Alberto and he swears to her husband defend until the end and not to lose it as he had lost his father (a lawyer accused of guerrilla during the Palace of Justice siege) and Escobar is surprised to know that Carlos Alberto was married, news learns that her mother-in-law to his subsequent misery.

The next day, the escape plan ahead since Escobar had pushed to Abril that he killed Carlos Alberto. This and Bernal argue wear dirty clothes to the laundry as a cover for their actions but Carlos Alberto is stopped by Abril arguing carried legal advice but a last minute Doña Luz saves him so write hisimony of death Susana de Acero but a quick maneuver, and a careless Abril, Carlos Alberto escapes to the laundry but not before he left a farewell note to Doña Luz telling also of his escape. At the last moment Victor encourages break to Esteban to redeem his guilt in the death of Lucas, which generates a small delay. Bernal was the first advance in the escape discovers in the second tunnel from prison personal effects of Lucas, among them a necklace which he shared with Esteban, while exhaust pipe gave a few former prison water tanks covered with bars. Given this latest difficulty they decided to abort the escape but Carlos Alberto knowing it would kill insists the break. Meanwhile, Moises intuiting Victor and other prisoners were going to escape, hides a coping saw between the shirts of the Minister of Justice to assist them but is discovered by Escobar who a trap them; kill Carlos Alberto taking the break as an excuse. Esteban to see the blade and ignoring Escobar plans takes it and returns to the pipe where with Bernal, Victor and Carlos Alberto cut studs. However, Esteban begins to suspect the ease of the tool on the floor of the laundry and Victor knowing Moises had occurred them and that this would not leave prison until nobody need one more. When Carlos Alberto cut off the last stud, 4 held the leak not knowing that several metres away Escobar and Abril were waiting them to kill Carlos Alberto. A prisoner warns Doña Luz of the torture that Escobar had punched him to Moises what makes social worker polled to Moises who warns him of the leak and the plan of Escobar to kill Carlos Alberto. Moises dies as a consequence of torture while fugitives 4 continue to his escape but still injured Victor manages to see Escobar and April and when the captain fires his gun to Carlos Alberto, Victor stands sacrificing his life for his best friend. Victor dies while that Bernal wins time shooting them Escobar and Abril, facts helplessly observed by Doña Luz. Carlos Alberto swears revenge against Escobar and Bernal and Esteban try to flee by bus but Escobar catches Carlos Alberto and swears kill him asking him to run as a hunting game and Carlos Alberto he complains that he is a murderer and runs but to the surprise of Escobar, Carlos Alberto completely disappears.

The news of the break comes to ears of Adriana who, in turn, gives the news to her parents in-laws. Furious Esteban claims Bernal have abandoned to Carlos Alberto, Bernal in addition to a den of criminals called "The cave of Neptune" carrying Esteban who after locates to Doña Luz believing that Escobar had killed Carlos Alberto, news that Doña Luz also gives the parents of Carlos Alberto and in turn displays to Alfonso Valdes a sleeve of bullet of Abril conducted staffing weapon once this and Escobar did believe that Victor had shot them (although Bernal was the only one carrying a weapon). Bernal tries to kill Esteban believing it has been betrayed, but to their surprise appears Carlos Alberto who had saved from death at the hands of Escobar after falling into a hole and filled with anger Captain achieved not find it. Bernal forces and Carlos Alberto and Esteban hiding in an attic and tells him to a mysterious woman of the underworld called Robin (Cristina Umaña) oversee them.

Escape and hiding 
While in the attic, Carlos Alberto admires the friendship that had been Esteban and Lucas but unlike those two did not carry photos of the deceased Víctor and asked Esteban that crime committed to be in jail also, Esteban replied he murdered his own father two years earlier, feeling discriminated against by Buendía makes him to think that every person is capable of killing and those who claim otherwise are less human. That same night Escobar says Dr. Sierra had not captured Buendía and at the same time makes Corporal Abril and the other guards to torture to Bernal's mates, who were spiteful that it had escaped and had abandoned them and they reveal that Bernal would be at the "Cave of Neptune" but they refuse to report its location. The next day, Bernal emerges from the hiding place for breakfast, leaving Robin in charge of fellow leak while Carlos Alberto and Esteban manage to unlock the door of the attic, but they are stopped by Robin once Esteban accidentally cut with a piece of Tin that partly ensured the attic door. Shortly after Escobar directs a police operative who manages to discover the location of the "Cave of Neptune" with information of "El Gozque". Robin hides in the attic and Carlos Alberto decides to wait Escobar to kill him to avenge Víctor but Esteban convinces him otherwise and the two decide to hide in the attic again to then see Robin with a severe bleeding after cutting with the piece of Tin. Robin with a little of their forces hides them in a secret closet while Esteban hides the bloodstains and Carlos Alberto makes a tourniquet to Robin with a piece of his sweater to stop the bleeding. The three lie avoiding Escobar to find them and at the same time Esteban prevents Carlos Albero kills the captain with the Bernal's revolver.

After failing to find the fugitives, Escobar, police and guards leave the place while Esteban and Carlos Alberto bring Robin to a hospital for him they cure their bleeding, once in the hospital Carlos Alberto donate his blood O- to Robin (whose real name was Robin Mireya Galeano) arguing to be husband of Robin and his court was a home accident. However, healing to Robin would not be to pay medical expenses by Esteban decides to beg on the street and manages to get enough money by Adriana who she casually about there after know that Alfonso Valdés had left the country by threats against him and his daughter. To make things worse, a police officer who was in the hospital following a case of a car accident discovers Carlos Alberto with Bernal's revolver in his pocket but Esteban manages to out him and Robin until the police arrests them and an emergency at the hospital helps them to lose to the police. Robin hides Carlos Alberto and Esteban in her flat in a suburb of class lower in the centre of Bogotá and locks them while she would return to the "Neptune cave" to then see how Bernal joins forces with Escobar to capture Carlos Alberto and Esteban.

Bernal argues seek help to flee the country and then follow Robin on the street to find Carlos Alberto and Stephen. The woman, realizing she was being followed hides in a brothel where the owner hides almost reluctantly. Bernal and April decide to wait out the night to catch Robin. Meanwhile, Carlos Alberto gets drunk to make brandy and Esteban love him confessing to say much to Victor (comparing with the situation of John Lennon and Paul McCartney in the death of the first) and Esteban calm him and confesses that although he likes women he is bisexual. Night out Abril and Bernal seek to Robin in the brothel. Abril creates a distraction with several strippers and Bernal finds Robin in the dressing rooms and kidnaps it while Abril is then captured by Escobar and the police during a requisition to the brothel. Later Robin wounds Bernal in the ear and escapes to her apartment where is Carlos Alberto vomiting of his drunkenness, the girl gives them clothes to change into and forced to flee, however, the two fugitives decide not to go without it to see that Bernal was at the entrance of the building by what it alert in time to the girl, who do not have enough time to dress and the three flee. Bernal searches each apartment for Robin until reach her the apartment she notes where the clothes of her and Carlos Alberto and Esteban therefore decides to stay to wait to kill her. To feel that someone approached the apartment, Bernal takes a silenced gun and tip several shots to then realize that he had murdered a drug dealer who always went to Robin for hid him several grams of cocaine.

Carlos Alberto and Esteban propose Robin accompany them but she rejects them not wanting to be involved in affairs so decides to return to his apartment, and to see that it is accused of murdering the dealer decides to return fugitive along with the two men. Carlos Alberto plans to flee the country with Esteban with the help to Adriana and Andrés. Robin, who initially believed Esteban and Carlos Alberto are gay, decides to help the latter to reunite with Adriana. Both go to the girl's house even though suspecting Adriana's relationship with Andres so they decide to wait and then posing as a friend of Adriana female release from prison, Robin gives Adriana signaled that Carlos Alberto was waiting in the basketball court. When spouses are reunited soon thereafter meet with Esteban and Robin to plan an escape from the country after the respective leakage situation. Meanwhile, Acero watching bad relationship with Adriana and Andres, orders Milton watch him, Milton hires turn Heraclito Botero (Jairo Soto), a corrupt cop for vigilate the boy. In turn, Carlos Alberto learns of the situation so Alfonso Valdes finally decides to flee the country while Andrés would try to recover the bullet cap of Corporal April whose Valdes had given Vengoechea and Acero to confront the threats and these would use in case Escobar betray them. Adriana after arguing with her mother decides to go to his aunt's estate not before meeting with Carlos Alberto and Andres planning to flee the country in one of the aircraft "Concorde", during that meeting are photographed by Botero and Milton immediately recognizes Carlos Alberto who believed dead after jailbreak. Andres decides to help parents of Carlos Alberto to join him but then decide to abort the plan to recognize "el Gozque" who guarded the Buendia house to give such information to Acero and Captain Escobar. Esteban, Adriana, Carlos Alberto and Robin decide to hide in the estate of the Adriana's aunt, unaware that they were being followed at first by "el Gozque" and later by Milton and Botero, these two wonder at a nearby store after seeing Andres asked in the same direction of the estate shortly before aborting the plan and returned to the city. On the property, Carlos Alberto rebuilds his relationship with Adriana, accepting difficult relationship to Esteban, who was attracted to Buendia. However, given the surprise of Adriana's mother who does not hide his indignation and repudiation of the three fugitives. Milton and Botero and do not delay in finding the farm where they take hostage Carlos Alberto, Adriana, her mother and Esteban. In a swift maneuver, Robin kills Milton who is known for Carlos and Adriana. Carlos Alberto convinces Robin not to kill Botero and also taken hostage when Betty (mother Adriana) decides to help Botero, Robin quickly neutralizes the police and is about to kill him but Carlos Alberto and Esteban discouraged her and instead leave Botero naked near a river and Milton's corpse thrown into the river. Meanwhile, Paulino (as the new head of the systems department replacing Carlos Alberto) doubt Carlos Alberto's guilt in the death of Susana and along with his father decide to investigate the whereabouts of the $2 million ransom paid for the course. The investigation since the bills were marked leads them to a Chinese launderers whose cover was a Chinese restaurant. Ricardo Diaz gives money launderers a commission in exchange for the names of their clients, despite being aware of the danger both, Ricardo decides to ignore the warnings of Paulino and later is killed and left in a place near the river where had been thrown the body of Milton. Paulino unhesitatingly confronts Steel and the executive committee of "Concorde", Acero made to believe to the Committee that Diaz had been killed as part of an alleged conspiracy against members of "Concorde" and whose victims was his own wife Susana.

Meanwhile, Betty starts to feel bad about what the fugitives hardly make the decision to let her go with Adriana but not before Carlos Alberto reproach him his mother's blessing to have had as his wife Adriana. Steel tries to call Milton, whose phone was now in the hands of Carlos, Esteban and Robin.

Acero also learn of the death of his partner learns of Milton, decides to help Botero to sink more to Buendia and naming his new henchman replacing Milton. Meanwhile, the three fugitives hiding in the brothel where Robin had previously hidden and Esteban that night disguised as "Estefania" a fictional co-worker of Adriana in "Concorde". Andres also learns of the alleged conspiracy in the alleged plotters were Milton and Ricardo Diaz to sink Concorde and therefore had been killed. Esteban accomplished using his false identity to talk to Adriana in her university (where she's studying Laws) for information to flee the country in one of the planes and whose opportunity arises for a trip to Panama whose Andres would do by order of his father (though a strategy to get him away from Buendia and Adriana) and who in turn directs Botero blame Buendia as the mastermind of the death of Milton, but Botero abort his mission after see Adriana in the reception and even Acero guarantees a good paying job. Andres decides to help the fugitives to flee the country as well as an information gained by Adriana, the captain would handle the plane was close to the family Acero, Captain Augusto Fajardo, decides to do a favor Andres despite his lack of prior planning. Esteban then takes the information to his friends (even Robin had never ridden in plane) while Carlos wrote a complete history of all that had happened to Susana and outlines a plan in would enter as stowaways on the plane which would land abandoned on a track through the jungle in Panama, for lack of money Robin decides to dress as a prostitute to get money which gets several dollars. Paulino who suspected the unusual flight of Andres to Panama mistakenly believe that on the plane were the 2 million dollars and encouraged by his mother plans to call the police into believing that the plane was leaving with a drug shipment. The flight leaves at 7:30 am for all but inadvertently anticipates the flight 15 minutes before due to weather conditions. Andres vainly tries to gain time to found with Fajardo and follow the plan but to his surprise addition to the advancement of flight is also changed the plane's captain. Robin, Carlos Alberto and Esteban arrive at the airport of "Concorde" ready to escape, but was surprised that the flight has left 15 minutes of anticipation, avoiding the police walking around the three enter the airport following the plan but Carlos Alberto cannot say goodbye Adriana. Andres to see them decide to follow the plan of opening the door once the plane turn around before take-off, which would prevent the control tower saw them. Once all three are up, the pilot and copilot ignore Andre's plans and fugitives, and fugitives ignore the sudden change pilot so Robin decides armed hijack the plane. Therefore, the plane takes off and surprise the police orders to cancel the flight (thanks to Paulino puff), Robin in principle stands firm on keeping kidnapped the plane in which Carlos and Andres vainly trying to dissuade her. Captain Pinzón police orders to stop the plane but Robin requisition even taking orders pilot at gunpoint to ignore your calls and requires the aircraft to take off. The captain ordered Lieutenant Bocanegra cross a Jeep on the track to prevent escape, Robin still requires the plane takes off but the plane being not very large can not avoid the Jeep because collide and kill those who were on the aircraft. Andrés and Carlos Alberto deter Robin because even though they were flying Air Force would force them to land or kill them. Having no other option, Andrés stop the aircraft and the pilots pressed by Robin to turn the aronave and fugitives flee taking advantage of the control tower would not see them. Robin, Carlos Alberto and Esteban manage to flee but Esteban was severely injured his right foot. Cops commandeer the plane then tracks the course without obtaining drug shipment while pilots, even under the threat of involving Andres with the fugitives, betray Carlos Alberto because Andres treated him and the other two very familiarly.

Cast 
Robinson Diaz.....Carlos Alberto Buendia
Cristina Umaña  ... Robin
Sandra Reyes.....Adriana Guerrero
Elluz Peraza.....Susana de Acero (commits suicide)
Jorge Cao.....Francisco de Paula Acero
Marlon Moreno.....Victor Leal (murdered by Captain Escobar)
Silvio Angel.....Julio Buendia (Carlos Alberto's father)
Ana Maria Arango.....Emperatriz Serrano de Buendia (Carlos Alberto's mother)
Lucy Martinez.....Beatriz 'Betty' (Adriana's mother)
Roberto Cano.....Andrés Acero (son of Francisco de Paula and Susana)
Rafael Martinez.....Paulino Díaz
Celmira Luzardo.....Luz de Caballero
Waldo Urrego.....Captain Hugo Escobar
Fabio Rubiano.....Rigoberto Bernal

External links 
 

1997 Colombian television series debuts
1998 Colombian television series endings
1997 telenovelas
Colombian telenovelas
Caracol Televisión telenovelas
Spanish-language telenovelas
Television shows set in Bogotá